Los Tomases Chapel is a historic building in Albuquerque, New Mexico. The chapel was built in the 1920s to serve the late-19th-century North Valley neighborhood of Los Tomases, and remained in occasional use in the 1980s. It was listed on the New Mexico State Register of Cultural Properties in 1983 and the National Register of Historic Places in 1984.

The chapel is a one-story adobe building in the New Mexico vernacular style. It is approximately rectangular in plan with a polygonal apse. The building has a corrugated metal gable roof with exposed rafters and a three-sided hipped section at the rear. Both the east and west sides have three arched, wood-framed 1-over-1 sash windows, and the front entrance has wooden double doors with a transom.

References

Churches on the National Register of Historic Places in New Mexico
National Register of Historic Places in Albuquerque, New Mexico
Roman Catholic churches in Albuquerque, New Mexico
New Mexico State Register of Cultural Properties